Allium melitense (Maltese) is a species of wild leek endemic to the Maltese archipelago.

It grows on rocky soils. It resembles Allium commutatum but is smaller (measuring about ) and with inflorescences rarely exceeding .

Synonyms 
 Allium ampeloprasum var. melitense Sommier & Caruana ex Borg

References

External links 
 
 
 (en) Reference: Catalogue of Life : Allium melitense (Sommier & Caruana ex Borg) Cif. & Giacom.
 
 
 

melitense
Endemic flora of Malta